Horia Agarici (April 6, 1911 – July 13, 1982) was a Romanian aviator and World War II flying ace.

Early life
Agarici was born in Lausanne, Switzerland, in the family of Constantin and Valeria, née Russo (Alecu Russo was a relative of hers). Valeria died in 1914, when Horia was 2 years old. The death of his mother and the remarriage of Constantin to Sofia Cerna, the daughter of a Bucharest lawyer, alienated Horia from his father.

Agarici lived much of his youth in Iași, Brașov, and Bucharest, where he attended the primary and the secondary schools. In 1929 he enrolled at the Polytechnical School in Timișoara; however, he dropped out for financial reasons (which also plunged him into depression), and in 1930 he enrolled instead at the Military Flying School in Bucharest.

Military career
For health reasons, he wasn't able to start his military training until 1931. Agarici didn't adapt easily to the military lifestyle: his military appearance looked a bit unkempt, he learned only what he considered interesting, and he openly voiced his disagreements with his superiors. Traian Stătescu, a colleague of his, described Agarici in his memoirs as "a well-mannered guy, whose upbringing could not be compared to any of ours, and for which he was laughed at; he had had a governess and spoke French perfectly. Horia Agarici minded his own business [..] and he didn't react to mockery and the pranks performed by his colleagues. He was covered in all kinds of insults, one worse than the other. He was impassive. He didn't react and that annoyed the troublemakers terribly".

Agarici graduated from the flying school on 8 June 1933, with the rank of second lieutenant, and was assigned to the Balloon Squadron in Pantelimon, Bucharest. He later reminisced that "I lived that one-year tour of duty at the Balloon Squadron in a world of mine, isolated from the military, reading and leading a young man's life in Bucharest. At the airbase we performed some studies for adapting the autogyro and the helicopter to the balloons".

In the autumn of 1934 he received the pilot license at the Flying School in Tecuci, and he was subsequently assigned to the Combat Group (a common fighter and bomber unit) based at Pipera Airport, near Bucharest. On 1 April 1937 the Combat Group was split into the 1st Fighter Group (based at Pipera) and the 1st Bomber Group (which was relocated to Brașov). Originally assigned to the Bomber Group, Second Lieutenant Agarici transferred to the 1st Fighter Group, where he finalized his specialty training on 6 June 1937 and was promoted to lieutenant.

World War II
The 1st Fighter Group was initially equipped with older Polish airplanes, PZL P.11 and PZL P.24. However, in early 1940 the Fighter Group received 12 Hawker Hurricane fighter aircraft from the United Kingdom, to the delight of Lieutenant Agarici, who immediately proceeded to study the technical manuals and later joined their assembly operations.

In January 1941, before Romania's entry in World War II on the side of Nazi Germany, Agarici was reassigned to the 53rd Fighter Squadron based at the Mamaia airfield in Northern Dobruja, which was tasked with defending the coastline, the port and city of Constanța, and the railroad to Bucharest. The squadron was equipped with the Hawker Hurricanes delivered the year before, because their engines were deemed more reliable than those of the German Heinkel He 112 and Messerschmitt Bf 109 (which were issued to other fighter squadrons, based inland), and therefore considered more suitable for air combat at sea.

On 22 June 1941, the day Operation Barbarossa was launched, the 53rd Fighter Squadron flew on a bomber escort mission to Buzău. Agarici had to stay behind at the Mamaia base because his airplane was under repair. At the base there was only another available Hawker Hurricane, also grounded and under repair due to engine overheating.

Agarici became famous a day later, on 23 June 1941, after a first wave of Soviet bombers had attacked the port of Constanța. When the second wave of Ilyushin DB-3's approached, he was allowed to fly the second Hawker Hurricane (the one having engine overheating problems) into action against the Soviet bombers. Afterwards the engine of the Hawker Hurricane started to overheat, causing Agarici to break off his attack and land at the base.

Agarici thus became the first Romanian aviator who managed to shoot down 3 enemy aircraft in a single battle.

By mid-1941, he claimed two more kills, and won ace status. In 1942, Agarici was assigned the command of the 52nd Flying Squadron in Mamaia, which was meant to defend Axis supply routes in the Black Sea. The next year, he was commander of the 7th Fighter Group on the Eastern Front, and chief of the operations' bureau.

During the United States Air Force raid on Bucharest in early 1944, he was in command of the 58th Fighter Squadron, which engaged the Fifteenth Air Force. During the confrontation, Agarici's plane was hit, and he had to make a forced landing, immediately after his last kill.

After World War II
After the Communist takeover, Agarici was dismissed from the Air Force. Between 1953 and 1955 he was deported to the village Neatârnarea in Tulcea County. In 1955 he was stripped of his rank, sentenced to 25 years hard labor, and imprisoned at the notorious Aiud Prison. In 1964 he was released and his rank of Captain was reinstated in 1965.

He died in 1982 and was buried with military honors in Constanța's Central Cemetery.

In 1994, a street in Constanța was named after him (although incorrectly at first); a street in Năvodari also bears his name.

See also
Bombing of Romania in World War II
List of World War II flying aces from Romania
Alexandru Șerbănescu
Constantin Cantacuzino
Romanian Air Force

References

Bibliography

External links

1911 births
1982 deaths
People from Lausanne
People from Constanța
Romanian expatriates in Switzerland
Politehnica University of Timișoara alumni
Romanian Air Force officers
Romanian World War II flying aces
20th-century Romanian poets
20th-century Romanian male writers
Romanian male poets
Romanian prisoners and detainees
Inmates of Aiud prison
Knights of the Order of the Crown (Romania)